The Tongan Democratic Labor Party is a political party in Tonga.  The party was founded on June 8, 2010, by members of the Tongan Public Servants Association. It planned to contest all 17 people's constituencies in the 2010 election.  Five of the party's 2010 candidates were women.

The party did not win any seats in the 2010 elections.

References

Labour parties
Political parties in Tonga
Political parties established in 2010
2010 establishments in Tonga